WKGL-FM (branded as "96.7 The Eagle") is a radio station serving the Rockford, Illinois area with a Classic Rock format. It broadcasts on FM frequency 96.7 MHz and is under ownership of Townsquare Media. Prior to being WKGL-FM, the station had an oldies format as WKMQ and a country format as WLUV-FM.

On August 30, 2013, a deal was announced in which Townsquare would acquire 53 Cumulus Media stations, including WKGL-FM, for $238 million. The deal was part of Cumulus' acquisition of Dial Global; Townsquare and Dial Global were both controlled by Oaktree Capital Management. The sale to Townsquare was completed on November 14, 2013.

References

External links
WKGL-FM official website
Townsquare Media Website

KGL-FM
Classic rock radio stations in the United States
Townsquare Media radio stations